Antxon or Antxón is the Basque form of the masculine given name Antton in use in the Basque Country. Notable people with this name include the following:

Antxón Muneta (born 1986), Spanish footballer
Antxon Olarrea, Spanish syntactician and linguist

See also

Anton (given name)
Anthon (given name)
Antoon
Antron (given name)
Antton (name)
Antwon (name)

Notes

Basque masculine given names